Alemungula is a traditional mancala game played by the people living along the border of Ethiopia and Sudan. The name "Alemungula" is specifically used by the Wataweat people of the Asosa-Beni Sangul area, while essentially the same game is called Um el Bagara by the Baggara people of Sudan. Another name used in Sudan for the same game is Mangala. For the muslim people of the Sudan-Ethiopian border, Alemungula/Um el Bagara is a typical game to play in the day hours during Ramadan.

References
 Gabata and related Board Games of Ethiopia and the Horn of Africa. In «Ethiopia Observer», 1971; 14 (3): 205.
 R. Davies, Some Arab Games and Puzzles. In «Sudan Notes & Records», 1925; 8: 137-152.

Traditional mancala games
Ethiopian culture
Sudanese culture